John Milton May (January 21, 1950 – May 31, 2017) was a Democratic member of the North Carolina House of Representatives. He was appointed by Governor Beverly Perdue to represent District 49 in the House on April 21, 2010, after being selected by local Democrats in the district (which includes all or parts of Franklin, Halifax, and Nash counties). He filled the vacancy left by the resignation of Rep. Lucy Allen. At the time of his appointment to the legislature, May, a retiree, was serving as a member of the Franklin County Board of Education. He was a veteran of the United States Army and was active in the Communication Workers of America.

After joining the House, May was appointed to represent his state on the new Virginia-North Carolina Interstate High-Speed Rail Compact board, and was appointed vice-chairman of the Local Government I committee.

May was defeated for election to a full term in 2010 by Glen Bradley. In 2012, May was elected to the Franklin County Board of Commissioners, an office he held until his death.

Electoral history

2016

2012

2010

References

External links
Governor's Proclamation appointing May

1950 births
2017 deaths
People from Franklin County, North Carolina
21st-century American politicians
School board members in North Carolina
County commissioners in North Carolina
Democratic Party members of the North Carolina House of Representatives